"She Was Only Seventeen (He Was One Year More)" is a song written and sung by Marty Robbins. The song was accompanied with Ray Coniff and His Orchestra, and released on the Columbia label.

Chart performance
In August 1958, it peaked at No. 4 on Billboards country and western best seller chart. It spent 10 weeks on the charts and was ranked No. 41 on Billboards 1958 year-end country and western chart. On the Hot 100, "She Was Only Seventeen (He Was One Year More)" peaked at No. 27.

See also
 Billboard year-end top 50 country & western singles of 1958

References

Marty Robbins songs
1958 songs